The minister of state for international environment is a junior ministerial position in the Department for Environment, Food and Rural Affairs. It is currently held by The Lord Benyon.

Responsibilities 
The minister’s responsibilities include:

International environment, climate, biodiversity and conservation
Animal Welfare
Forestry policy – domestic and international
International Whaling Commission
International ocean (including ocean and climate, marine biodiversity (including overseas territories marine biodiversity), marine litter and blue finance)
Illegal wildlife trade, Corridors, Kaza
Green recovery
International green finance
Lead for Forestry Commission
Lords Minister for environment, including Environment Bill

List of ministers

See also 
 Department for Environment, Food and Rural Affairs
 Secretary of State for Environment, Food and Rural Affairs
 Minister of State for Food
Parliamentary Under-Secretary of State for Growth and Rural Affairs

References 

Lists of government ministers of the United Kingdom
Ministerial offices in the United Kingdom
2019 establishments in the United Kingdom